Monroe High School is a public high school in Monroe, Oregon, United States.

Academics
In 2008, 75% of the school's seniors received a high school diploma. Of 28 students, 21 graduated, three dropped out, and four were still in high school the following year.

Notable alumni
Dave Wolverton

See also
 Washington-Monroe High School

References

High schools in Benton County, Oregon
Public high schools in Oregon